Mayol Kur Akuei is the current Vice President of Greater Pioneer Operating Company (GPOC). He has been the Governor of Ruweng State, South Sudan since 24 December 2015. He is the first governor of the state, which was created by President Salva Kiir on 2 October 2015.

More information at www.ruwengstate.org

References

Living people
South Sudanese politicians
Year of birth missing (living people)